Centrioncinae is a subfamily of stalk-eyed flies in the family Diopsidae.

Species
Genus Centrioncus Speiser, 1910
C. aberrans Feijen, 1983
C. angusticercus Feijen, 1983
C. bytebieri De Meyer, 2004
C. decellei Feijen, 1983
C. decoronotus Feijen, 1983
C. jacobae Feijen, 1983
C. prodiopsis Speiser, 1910
GenusTeloglabrus Feijen, 1983
T. australis Feijen, 1983
T. curvipes Feijen, 1983
T. duplospinosus Feijen, 1983
T. entabensis Feijen, 1983
T. lebombensis Feijen, 1983
T. londti Feijen, 1983
T. milleri Feijen, 1983
T. pelecyformis Feijen, 1983
T. prolongatus Feijen, 1983
T. sabiensis Feijen, 1983
T. sanorum Feijen, 1983
T. stuckenbergi Feijen, 1983
T. trituberculatus Feijen, 1983
T. tsitsikamensis Feijen, 1983
T. vumbensis Feijen, 1983

References

Diopsidae
Brachycera subfamilies
Diptera of Africa